Jack O'Malley may refer to:
 Jack O'Malley (Michigan politician)
 Jack O'Malley (Illinois politician)